Florence Parly (born 8 May 1963) is a French politician who served as Minister of the Armed Forces under President Emmanuel Macron from 2017 to 2022. A former member of the Socialist Party (PS), she previously served as Secretary of State for the Budget from 2000 to 2002 under President Jacques Chirac.

Career
An alumna of Sciences Po and the École nationale d'administration, Parly was appointed Secretary of State for the Budget on 3 January 2000 in the government of Prime Minister Lionel Jospin. In office until 6 May 2002, she seconded Christian Sautter, then Laurent Fabius at the Ministry of Finance.

After briefly serving as a member of the Burgundy Regional Council from 2004 to 2006, Parly worked at Air France as deputy general director from 2006 until 2014, where she was in charge of passenger activity at Orly Airport and stopovers in France. 

In 2014, Parly moved on to become director-general of SNCF Voyageurs until 2017.

Minister of the Armies

Parly was named Minister of the Armies on 21 June 2017 after Sylvie Goulard was forced to resign due to an ongoing investigation of her party. Following the nomination, she resigned from all her board positions; her husband Martin Vial withdrew from his position on the board of Thales Group.

Internal investigations

Shortly after taking office, Parly ordered an investigation into allegations brought forward by the satirical weekly Le Canard enchaîné that the acting head of the French Air Force borrowed a Dassault/Dornier Alpha Jet on weekends to fly from his base in Bordeaux to his home in Provence.

In 2020, Parly placed a French lieutenant colonel, based in Italy and stationed with NATO, under investigation over a suspected breach of security after having passed sensitive documents to the Russian secret services.

International crises

Regarding the Iran Nuclear Deal, Parly told BFM TV in 2019 that "nothing would be worse than Iran leaving this deal. We absolutely want to keep this agreement alive". Following the US-led Baghdad airstrike in January 2020 that killed Iranian Quds Force leader Qasem Soleimani, Parly rejected pressure to withdraw French troops from Iraq, even stating on her Twitter account that France had already reinforced security for its 160 soldiers stationed in Iraq.  She further reiterated that it was the French government's priority to fight against ISIS militants, who were re-merging in the area. Parly also warned Iran not to escalate tensions.

Under Parly's leadership, France joined military exercises with Italy, Greece and Cyprus in the Eastern Mediterranean amid a worsening dispute between Turkey and Greece over energy resources in the region in 2020. During that conflict, Parly underlined that France would stand by Greece and Cyprus. On her initiative, NATO investigated French accusations that the Turkish Naval Forces failed to respond to an allied call to inspect a vessel in the Mediterranean, an incident suspected to involve Turkish arms smuggling to Libya. 

By mid-2021, Parly oversaw the phase-out of Operation Barkhane with some 5,100 soldiers across the Sahel region, and its transition into the Takuba Task Force. As part of Operation Barkhane, she also authorized the killing of al Qaeda leader Baye ag Bakabo in June 2021; Bakabo had been determined the chief suspect for having abducted and shot Radio France Internationale journalists Claude Verlon and Ghislaine Dupont in November 2013.

The announcement of the AUKUS security pact between the United States, the United Kingdom, and Australia in September 2021 sparked a period of diplomatic tensions in French-American and French-Australian relations. The French government received official notification from Australia that the Attack-class submarine project, involving a A$90 billion Australian contract to buy 12 French submarines, was to be cancelled only a few hours before it was publicly announced. In a joint statement, Parly and French foreign minister Jean-Yves Le Drian expressed disappointment at Australia's decision to abandon their joint submarine program with France.

Parly's tenure as Armed Forces Minister was marked by the 2021 Tribune des généraux published in Valeurs actuelles, which spanned talk of a coup d'état after tens of retired army officers openly criticised Macron's leadership in the fight against Islamism and warned of a possible civil war.

Military procurement
In 2022, Parly led talks with Ministry of Defense Prabowo Subianto over Indonesia´s decision to order 42 Dassault Rafale fighter jets in a $8.1 billion deal, making Jakarta the biggest French arms client in the Indo-Pacific region.

Other activities
 Altran, Member of the Board of Directors (–2017)
 Ingenico, Member of the Board of Directors (–2017)
 Zodiac Aerospace, Member of the Board of Directors (2016–2017)
 Banque Publique d'Investissement, Member of the Board of Directors (–2015)
 Servair, Member of the Board of Directors (–2014)

References

External links

 

|-

1963 births
21st-century French women politicians
Female defence ministers
French Ministers of Defence
French Ministers of Defence and Veterans Affairs
Living people
Sciences Po alumni
École nationale d'administration alumni
People from Boulogne-Billancourt
Socialist Party (France) politicians
Women government ministers of France
20th-century French women politicians
21st-century French politicians